What If Nothing is the fourth studio album by American rock band Walk the Moon. It was released on November 10, 2017, by RCA Records. The first single released from the album was "One Foot" on September 22, 2017. Walk the Moon embarked on the North American Press Restart Tour in support of the album, beginning on November 19 in Charlotte, North Carolina. They released the first promotional single "Headphones" on October 13, 2017. The second promotional single "Surrender" was released on October 27, 2017. This is the last studio album to feature bassist Kevin Ray, who parted ways with the band in 2020. The album follows-up their previous album Talking is Hard

Track listing

Personnel
Nick Petricca – vocals, keyboards, percussion, programming, songwriting
Kevin Ray – bass, vocals, programming, songwriting
Sean Waugaman – drums, percussion, vocals, programming, songwriting
Eli Maiman – guitar, vocals, programming, songwriting

Charts

References

2017 albums
Walk the Moon albums
RCA Records albums